Sakae Takahashi (December 8, 1919April 16, 2001) was a Japanese American politician from Hawaii.

Early life and education 
Takahashi was born on December 8, 1919 in Makaweli. He grew up on a sugar plantation and attended Waimea High School. After high school he studied at the University of Hawaii on a scholarship and joined the ROTC.

Career 
After graduating from college, Takahashi joined the Army Reserve and became a second lieutenant in 1941. During World War II he served as a member of the 100th Infantry Battalion. He was the only survivor of 190 men during the battle of Monte Cassino. By the time he was discharged in 1946 he had risen to the rank of major.

After leaving the army Takahashi studied law at Rutgers University. When he returned to Hawaii after graduation he worked as an attorney. He was elected to the Board of Supervisors in 1950. Takahashi was elected to the Territorial Senate in 1954, and remained there when the territory became a state. He convinced Daniel Inouye to enter politics that year, beginning the Hawaii Democratic Revolution of 1954. He served in the senate until 1974, and as a delegate to the 1968 Constitutional Convention. He also worked with several other Japanese Americans to form Central Pacific Bank, which he served as the chairman of for 17 years. He also served on the boards of several other organizations.

Takahashi died on April 16, 2001.

References

External links 

 Archival collection held by the Japanese American National Museum
 Oral history interview held by the Japanese Cultural Center of Hawaii
 Oral history interview held by the University of Hawaii at Manoa

1919 births
2001 deaths
People from Kauai County, Hawaii
University of Hawaiʻi alumni
Rutgers University alumni
20th-century American politicians
American military personnel of Japanese descent
American politicians of Japanese descent
Hawaii politicians of Japanese descent
Members of the Hawaii Territorial Legislature
Military personnel from Hawaii